Hella Eckardt  is an archaeologist who specialises in Roman archaeology and material culture and a professor at the University of Reading. Since 2018 she has been the Editor of the journal Britannia.

Career
Eckardt studied for a bachelor's degree at the Johannes Gutenberg University Mainz, a master's degree at the University of London, before completing her doctorate at the University of Reading. She was elected as a Fellow of the Society of Antiquaries of London in 2006. In 2018, Eckardt was won the Archaeologist of the Year award, organised by Current Archaeology. Eckardt is currently the Editor of the journal Britannia, published by Cambridge University Press.

Eckardt gave the keynote speech at the Theoretical Roman Archaeology Conference 2017, entitled "Roman Objects, Migrants and Identities in the Age of Brexit and trump". Her paper discussed how developing technologies, such as aDNA, that affect how we see geography and race in the past will influence modern perspectives on those topics.

Romans Revealed
Along with Mary Lewis and Gundula Müldner, Eckardt led a project researching the archaeological evidence for immigration in Roman Britain and how these people interacted. The project was funded by the Arts and Humanities Research Council (£337,000) and the results were used to inform displays at the Yorkshire Museum and create educational resources for Key Stage 2 pupils. The team produced the 'Romans Revealed' website (romansrevealed.com) aimed at school children to give more information on Roman Britain, broadening the history taught in schools which usually focuses on men from Italy. The AHRC provided additional funding (62,000) while the Runnymede Trust also supported the project to help the website addressed what children wanted to learn about.

Select bibliography
Eckardt, H. and Walton, P. 2021. Bridge over troubled water: The Roman finds from the River Tees at Piercebridge in context (Britannia Monograph 34). London, Society for the Promotion of Roman Studies. 
Eckardt, H. 2018. Writing and power in the Roman world: literacies and material culture. Cambridge University Press, New York. 
Eckardt, H. 2014. Objects and Identities: Roman Britain and the north-western provinces. Oxford University Press, Oxford. 
Eckardt, H., Muldner, G. and Lewis, M. 2014. "People on the move in Roman Britain". World Archaeology 46 (4). pp. 534–550. 
Eckardt, H. and Crummy, N. 2008. Styling the body in late Iron Age and Roman Britain: a contextual approach to toilet instruments (Instrumentum Monograph No. 36). Instrumentum, Montagnac.

References

External links 

 Roman Revealed website

Living people
Alumni of the University of London
Alumni of the University of Reading
Academics of the University of Reading
Historians of ancient Rome
Fellows of the Society of Antiquaries of London
British women archaeologists
British women historians
Year of birth missing (living people)